Marions bank is an islet in Palmerston Island in the Cook Islands. It is on the north side of the atoll, between Tara i tokerau and Motu Ngangie. The islet is named after one of the first people born on Palmerston.

References

Palmerston Island